Castle Stalker is a four-storey tower house or keep. It is set on a tidal islet on Loch Laich, an inlet off Loch Linnhe. The islet is accessible with difficulty from the shore at low tide. The name "Stalker" comes from the Gaelic Stalcaire, meaning "hunter" or "falconer". The island castle is one of the best preserved medieval tower houses to survive in western Scotland and is a Category A listed building. It stands in the Lynn of Lorn National Scenic Area, one of forty such areas in Scotland.

The castle was used as one of the locations for the film Monty Python and the Holy Grail.

History
The original castle was a small fort, built around 1320 by Clan MacDougall who were then Lords of Lorn.  Around 1388 the Stewarts took over the Lordship of Lorn, and it is believed that they built the castle in its present form around the 1440s. The Stewarts' relative King James IV of Scotland visited the castle, and a drunken bet around 1620 resulted in the castle passing to Clan Campbell. After the castle changed hands between these clans a couple of times, the Campbells finally abandoned it about 1840 when it lost its roof. In 1908 the castle was bought by Charles Stewart of Achara, who carried out basic conservation work. In 1965 Lt. Col. D. R. Stewart Allward acquired the castle and over about ten years fully restored it. Castle Stalker remains in private ownership and is open to the public at selected times during the summer.

For the 2011 census the island on which the castle stands was classified by the National Records of Scotland as an inhabited island that "had no usual residents at the time of either the 2001 or 2011 censuses."

In popular culture
While most castle scenes in the film Monty Python and the Holy Grail (1975) were shot in and around Doune Castle, Castle Stalker appears in the final scene as "The Castle Aaaaarrrrrrggghhh". A French castle guard (John Cleese) taunts King Arthur (Graham Chapman) in a French accent from its battlements.

The castle also makes a brief appearance in the film Highlander: Endgame.

The castle features briefly in Netflix's Sense8 as the estate belonging to the "Old Man of Hoy" portrayed by Sylvester McCoy.

Castle Stalker is the inspiration for "Castle Keep" in the children's book The Boggart by Susan Cooper.

References

External links

Castle Stalker web site

Castles in Argyll and Bute
Category A listed buildings in Argyll and Bute
Listed castles in Scotland
Clan MacDougall
Hunting lodges in Scotland
Tower houses in Scotland
Tidal islands of Scotland